Cerautola adolphifriderici is a butterfly in the family Lycaenidae. It is found in Cameroon and the Democratic Republic of the Congo.

The butterfly was named to honour Adolphus Frederick V, Grand Duke of Mecklenburg-Strelitz.

References

External links
Die Gross-Schmetterlinge der Erde 13: Die Afrikanischen Tagfalter. Plate XIII 65 b

Butterflies described in 1911
Poritiinae
Butterflies of Africa